Bispebjerg station is a station on the S-train Ring Line in Copenhagen, Denmark. Located on the boundary between the Nørrebro and Bispebjerg districts, it serves parts of each.

See also
 List of railway stations in Denmark

S-train (Copenhagen) stations
Railway stations opened in 1996
Railway stations in Denmark opened in the 20th century